The 1995 IAAF Grand Prix Final was the eleventh edition of the season-ending competition for the IAAF Grand Prix track and field circuit, organised by the International Association of Athletics Federations. It was held on 9 September at the Stade Louis II in Fontvieille, Monaco.

Moses Kiptanui (3000 metres steeplechase) and Maria Mutola (800 metres) were the overall points winners of the tournament. Mutola became the first African woman to win the overall series.  A total of 18 athletics events were contested, ten for men and eight for women.

Medal summary

Men

Women

References
IAAF Grand Prix Final. GBR Athletics. Retrieved on 2015-01-17.

External links
IAAF Grand Prix Final archive from IAAF

Grand Prix Final
Grand Prix Final
International athletics competitions hosted by Monaco
IAAF Grand Prix Final
IAAF Grand Prix Final